Thermobrachium is an obligate anaerobic, moderately alkaliphilic, thermophilic and proteolytic genus of bacteria from the family of Clostridiaceae with one known species (Thermobrachium celere).

References

Clostridiaceae
Bacteria genera
Monotypic bacteria genera
Taxa described in 1996